The 9th AVN Awards ceremony, presented by Adult Video News (AVN), honored pornographic films released in 1991 in the United States and took place in January 1992, at Bally's Hotel and Casino in Paradise, Nevada. During the ceremony, AVN presented AVN Awards in 59 categories. The ceremony was produced by Anthony Devon and directed by Steven Austin. Actor Randy West hosted the show for the first time, with actresses Angela Summers and Hyapatia Lee as co-hosts.

On Trial 1: In Defense of Savannah won the most awards with five, but tied for Best Film with Wild Goose Chase, which won four awards. Fetish was the gay movie with the most awards, also winning four.

Winners and nominees 

The winners were announced during the awards ceremony in January 1992.

Major awards 

Winners are listed first, highlighted in boldface, and indicated with a double dagger.

Additional award winners 

These awards were also announced at the awards show.

 Best Actor—Gay Video: Ryan Yeager, Jumper
 Best All-Girl Feature: Buttwoman
 Best All-Sex Feature: Buttman's European Vacation
 Best Alternative Adult Release: Love Scenes, Volume One
 Best Amateur Tape: The Hard Drive
 Best Anal-Themed Feature: Dr. Butts
 Best Art Direction—Video: Hunchback of Notre Dame
 Best Bisexual Video: Innocence Found
 Best Boxcover Concept: Derrier, Coast to Coast
 Best Boxcover Concept—Gay Video: Behind the Eight Ball, Vivid Video
 Best Cinematography: John Stagliano, Wild Goose Chase
 Best Compilation Tape: Best of Buttman
 Best Director—Bisexual Video: Paul Norman, Innocence Found
 Best Director—Gay Video: Jean-Daniel Cadinot, The Traveling Journeyman
 Best Editing—Film: On Trial 1: In Defense of Savannah
 Best Editing, Gay Video: Mark Tomas, Brad Braverman; Fetish
 Best Editing—Video: Curse Of The Cat Woman
 Best Featurette Tape: Scarlet Fantasy

 Best Gay Solo Tape: Men Who Work It Alone
 Best Gay Video Feature: Jumper
 Best Music: Wild Goose Chase
 Best Music, Gay Video: “Rude Boy”, Fetish
 Best Newcomer, Gay Video: Danny Sommers
 Best Non-Sexual Performance: Carl Esser, On Trial 1: In Defense of Savannah
 Best Non-Sexual Performance, Gay Video: Sharon Kane, Majestic Knights
 Best Overall Marketing Campaign (tie): Blow Out, Infinity Video; Mr. Peepers, the series; LBO Entertainment
 Best Packaging—Film: New Wave Hookers 2, VCA Platinum
 Best Packaging—Gay Video: Behind the Eight Ball, Vivid Video
 Best Packaging—Video: Obsession, CDI Home Video
 Best Pro-Amateur Tape: Mr. Peepers Volume 25
 Best Screenplay—Film: Carl Esser, On Trial 1: In Defense of Savannah
 Best Screenplay—Gay Video: Jim Steel, Prince Charming
 Best Sex Scene—Gay Video: Jason Ross, Ryan Yeager; Fetish
 Best Supporting Actor—Gay Video: Jason Ross, One Night Stands
 Best Videography: Curse of the Cat Woman
 Best Videography, Gay Video: Mark Tomas, Fetish

Honorary AVN awards

Hall of Fame 
AVN Hall of Fame inductees for 1992 were: Ron Vogel, Rick Savage, Candida Royalle, Hyapatia Lee, Porsche Lynn, Michael Morrison, Mike Horner, Samantha Fox, Herschel Savage, Chris Cassidy, Britt Morgan

Multiple nominations and awards 
The following twelve movies received multiple awards:

 5 - On Trial 1: In Defense of Savannah
 4 - Fetish, Wild Goose Chase
 3 - Buttman's European Vacation, Curse Of The Cat Woman
 2 - Behind The Eight Ball, Innocence Found, Jumper, Mr. Peepers Volume 25, New Wave Hookers 2

Presenters and performers 
The following individuals, in order of appearance, presented awards or performed musical numbers.

Presenters

Performers 

Chi Chi LaRue and the Stingers performed a musical number during the show.

Ceremony information 

Actor Randy West hosted the show for the first time. His co-host for the first half of the show was Angela Summers while Hyapatia Lee co-hosted the last half. It was the seventh time the awards were presented live in Las Vegas and the first time they were held in the Grand Ballroom of Bally's Casino.

Several other people were involved with the production of the ceremony. The live show was produced by Gary Todd, Mark Stone and Paul Fishbein. A VHS videotape of the show was also published and sold by VCA Pictures, which was produced by Anthony Devon and directed by Steven Austin.

New Wave Hookers 2 was announced as the Best Selling Tape of 1991 while the Best Renting Tape of the year was The Masseuse.

Critical reviews 

High Society magazine termed the awards banquet "awesome." Hot Videos Illustrated said, "As usual, the parade of stars attracted every hot body in Vegas, much to the approval of a horny audience."

See also 

 AVN Award for Best Actor
 AVN Award for Best Actress
 AVN Award for Best Supporting Actor
 AVN Award for Best Supporting Actress
 AVN Award for Male Performer of the Year
 AVN Award for Male Foreign Performer of the Year
 AVN Award for Female Foreign Performer of the Year
 List of members of the AVN Hall of Fame

Notes

 Ashley Nicole was announced as one of the four winners of the Best Sex Scene—Film category, however, this was an error as she was not in the movie. The correct actress, Taylor Wane, was reported in Adult Video News and Hot Videos Illustrated magazines.

References

Bibliography

External links 

 
 Adult Video News Awards  at the Internet Movie Database
 
 
 

AVN Awards
1991 film awards
AVN Awards 9
1991 in Nevada